Niko Bellic is a fictional character and the playable protagonist of Rockstar North's 2008 video game Grand Theft Auto IV, the sixth main instalment in Rockstar Games' Grand Theft Auto series. He also makes non-playable appearances in the game's episodic content The Lost and Damned and The Ballad of Gay Tony, both released in 2009. Michael Hollick provided the character's voice and motion capture.

Within the game's storyline, Niko is an ex-soldier from Eastern Europe, who was shaped by his experiences in an unidentified war he fought in, developing a very cynical view on life. After becoming involved with a Russian crime syndicate, and discovering that his unit was sold out to enemy forces, he decides to move to Liberty City to pursue the American Dream, inspired by his cousin Roman’s personal tales of luxury and riches that he had experienced while living there for the past decade. However, upon his arrival, he discovers that those stories were greatly exaggerated, and attempts to improve his and Roman's financial situation by becoming involved with the local criminal underworld. As the game's story progresses, Niko works for various prominent fictional crime figures, in the hopes of finding the traitor who betrayed his unit during the war, while slowly learning to let go of his past and quest for revenge, and attempting to leave the criminal life that comes with major risks.

Niko's character received critical acclaim for his maturity, moral ambiguity, and personal growth, and has been frequently called the best protagonist in the series. For his role, Hollick won Best Performance by a Human Male at the 2008 Spike Video Game Awards.

Nationality
Niko's nationality is unspecified in the game and is subject to debate. It was believed by some that he was Russian, Serbian, or Croatian. Executive producer Sam Houser spoke on the matter, saying that Niko is "from that grey part of broken-down Eastern Europe", suggesting that Niko's nationality was left intentionally vague or to the interpretation of the player. Following the game's release, several journalists referred to Niko as Serbian. In the game, it is suggested by his cousin Roman that Niko can speak Serbian.

Biography

Early life 
Niko was born to Milica Bellic and an unnamed father in an unspecified country in Eastern Europe. Milica, a maternal and caring presence in Niko's life, regrets that her sons have been forced to endure the hardships they did as children, including their abusive, alcoholic father. As a teenager, Niko participated in an unnamed war as an infantryman, tank operator, and helicopter pilot, during which he witnessed numerous atrocities that traumatised him, leading to his cynical view on life. After his unit of fifteen men from his village were ambushed by the enemy, Niko escaped and concluded that the unit had been betrayed by one of their own soldiers. He later learned that there are two other survivors, Florian Cravic and Darko Brevic, and vowed to search for the traitor.

After the war, Niko experienced difficulty leading a normal life, and his brother was killed in action. Knowing only violence, Niko turned to the Balkanic criminal underworld. He joined a smuggling and trafficking ring run by Russian crime lord Ray Bulgarin. During one smuggling run into Italy, the boat that Niko was working on sank in the Adriatic Sea. He was able to swim to safety, but Bulgarin accused him of sinking the ship intentionally to escape with the money. Niko later joined the merchant navy to flee from Bulgarin, befriended the crew of the Platypus cargo ship, and contemplated his cousin Roman's requests for him to come to Liberty City in the United States.

Arriving in Liberty City 
Once in Liberty City in 2008, Niko quickly realises that Roman's stories of success were exaggerated. In reality, his cousin lives in a small, decrepit apartment in the Broker district, and owes gambling debts across the city, which he struggles to pay through his unprofitable taxi service. In addition to working for Roman as a cab driver, Niko must protect him from loan sharks and work for Russian gangster Vlad Glebov to prevent Roman from sinking further into debt. Niko completes most of the jobs he is given with ease, as his military skills give him an advantage over the street thugs of Liberty City. During this time, he also begins making criminal contacts that will eventually become important allies, such as Yardie underboss Little Jacob and car entrepreneur Brucie Kibbutz. Niko's professional and personal relationships expand over the course of the game, as he is introduced to more powerful and influential criminals.

After Niko kills Vlad as revenge for sleeping with Roman's long-time girlfriend Mallorie, he and Roman are kidnapped by Russian mobsters on orders of their boss Mikhail Faustin. Not bothered by Vlad's murder, Faustin releases them and later employs Niko as a hitman. Niko quickly discovers Faustin's true nature after being ordered to kill the son of powerful Russian crime lord Kenny Petrović. When Petrović threatens retaliation, Faustin's deputy Dimitri Rascalov convinces Niko to assassinate Faustin to make amends, but later betrays him by bringing him before Ray Bulgarin, revealed to be an old friend of Dimitri's, who demands what he is owed. With Little Jacob's help, Niko survives the ambush, but Dimitri and Bulgarin later retaliate by burning down Roman's apartment and cab depot.

Searching for the traitor and further criminal ventures 
Forced to move to the Bohan district and lay low for a while, Niko begins making new criminal contacts, including several drug dealers and the Irish mob, for whom he begins working in an effort to secure a better life and locate Florian, who Niko knows also lives in Liberty City. In the process, he befriends Irish gangster Patrick McReary, and discovers that his girlfriend Michelle is an undercover government agent actually named Karen, who entraps Niko into working for her agency, known only by its cover: the United Liberty Paper (ULP). Niko assassinates several known or suspected terrorists for the agency in exchange for clearing his criminal record and assistance in finding the man who betrayed his unit.

After assisting Ray Boccino, a caporegime in the Pegorino Crime Family with an important diamond deal, Niko finally locates Florian, now the flamboyant homosexual Bernie Crane, only to discover he is not the traitor. He then sets off to find Darko, now revealed as the one who betrayed their unit, while continuing to work for the Italian Mafia in Liberty City, including the Pegorino and Gambetti families. While helping Patrick trade Don Giovanni Ancelotti's kidnapped daughter for the diamonds, Niko crosses paths with Bulgarin again, whose interference in the exchange results in the diamonds' loss.

During this time, Niko's conflict with Dimitri escalates as the former rescues Roman after he is kidnapped by Dimitri's men, thwarts his plot to blackmail Liberty City's deputy mayor, and disrupts his drug operations while working for the Mafia. Niko and Roman eventually secure the lifestyle they sought after the latter rebuilds his taxi company and buys a new apartment in Algonquin using insurance money from his formerly destroyed business.

Tying up loose ends 
Eventually, the ULP locates Darko and brings him to Liberty City for Niko to decide his fate. Having achieved closure on his past, Niko is summoned by Don Jimmy Pegorino for one final favour: to help with an extremely lucrative deal on heroin in collusion with Dimitri. After learning where Dimitri is, however, Niko is left to choose between exacting revenge on him or going through with the deal.

The former scenario sees Niko successfully killing Dimitri and his men, only for Pegorino, enraged at losing out on a substantial profit, to try and exact revenge on him at Roman and Mallorie's wedding. Pegorino performs a drive-by attack on Niko, but accidentally kills Patrick's sister Kate, whom Niko had been dating. Little Jacob and Roman help Niko find and kill Pegorino, who by this point was targeted by most of the Liberty City underworld. If Niko instead agrees to work with Dimitri again, the latter betrays him by keeping the heroin for himself, and sending a hitman to murder him at Roman and Mallorie's wedding. Niko survives the attempt on his life, but the hitman accidentally kills Roman with a stray bullet. With Little Jacob's help, the vengeful and devastated Niko tracks down and kills Dimitri, who in turn murdered Pegorino.

Depending on the ending chosen, Niko is later informed by Mallorie or Roman that the former is pregnant. He either vows to protect the child and become a father figure for them, or is told by Roman that the couple have decided to name their child in Kate's memory, should it be a girl. Either way, the game ends with Niko musing on the American Dream and concluding that it is a hollow promise, which no one can truly achieve.

Later life 
In Grand Theft Auto V, set in 2013, Lester Crest briefly refers to "an Eastern European making moves in Liberty City" who "went quiet", implying Niko left his life of crime behind. If selected as a crew member for a heist, Patrick, who has moved to Los Santos some time after the events of Grand Theft Auto IV, will mention Niko by name while talking about a bank robbery they carried out together; Patrick claims that he has not heard from Niko since he left Liberty City and that the latter is "probably dead". An Easter egg in the game reveals that Niko still works for Roman's taxi company, and an in-game social media post indicates that the latter is alive.

Characteristics 

Niko is portrayed as a down-to-business man with a volatile temper. He has a dry, sarcastic sense of humour, and often makes acerbic remarks. Though he regrets his past crimes, he feels that his soul is permanently tainted, and that killing is all he can do. Niko appears to be a more mature, empathetic, and sensible person than many of his acquaintances. His female acquaintances often point out that Niko has sophisticated manners and appears to be a very courteous person. Many times he attempts to resolve conflicts between two parties without the use of violence.

The most significant aspect of Niko's personality is his cynicism, which he gained in the war. Although generally he is a caring individual, Niko's realistic view of life allows him the ability to manipulate people. Niko's biggest weakness is his inability to let go of the past, and the desire for revenge is a driving force in many of his decisions. Despite his long involvement with criminal activity, Niko holds a somewhat sympathetic view of law enforcement, stating that cops are just people trying to survive. Near the end of the game, Niko expresses a desire to move on from his criminal past and get a fresh start. Niko has a distaste for drugs, despite his frequent involvement in the drugs trade, and regularly refuses offers of marijuana by Little Jacob.

Portrayal 

Niko Bellic is voiced by Michael Hollick. Hollick was paid about $100,000 for his voice acting and motion-capture work over the course of about 15 months from 2006 to 2007. Hollick was paid about $1,050 a day for his work on the game, about 50% more than the standard Screen Actors Guild-negotiated rate for actors, although he claimed it was still a fraction of the income he would receive from a film or TV-show performance, and that he was upset about not getting residuals from game sales, putting the blame on the union for not securing such agreements. Hollick told The New York Times that while he was a theatre student at Carnegie Mellon University he developed a talent for dialects.

Actor and former mixed martial artist Bas Rutten performed the motion capture for Niko's fighting scenes; he worked on the game for over a year, and brought mixed martial artist Amir Perets for additional work. Niko's fighting style is primarily Krav Maga.

Russian actor Vladimir Mashkov claims he was in discussions with Rockstar Games to voice the character, and that the character's appearance is based on him, specifically from his role of the Tracker, Sasha Ivanic, in the 2001 movie Behind Enemy Lines, but he ultimately turned down the offer. Rockstar Games have not commented on Mashkov's claims.

Other appearances 
Niko plays a minor role in both of Grand Theft Auto IVs expansion packs, The Lost and Damned and The Ballad of Gay Tony (both 2009), which take place simultaneously with the storyline of the base game, from the perspective of characters with minor roles in GTA IV's narrative. He appears as an NPC in the missions that cross over with the base game.

Niko is mentioned several times in Grand Theft Auto V (2013), indirectly by Lester Crest, who, when planning a jewellery store robbery alongside protagonist Michael De Santa, considers "an Eastern European guy making moves in Liberty City" as a possible accomplice, before dismissing the idea, claiming that he "went quiet". If selected as a crew member for "The Paleto Score", Patrick McReary will talk about the bank heist he, Niko, his brother Derrick, and accomplice Michael Keane carried out in Liberty City, mentioning how the latter two are dead and that Niko is probably dead as well, as he hasn't heard from him in the past five years. As an Easter egg in the game, players can view Niko's LifeInvader profile, which reveals that he is still working for Roman's taxi company. Niko's latest message to his cousin is wishing him a happy birthday; this implies that Roman survived the game's events.

In the "Collector's Edition" of Grand Theft Auto Online, players can choose what their character is to look like by selecting between different parents; Niko is one of the special parents available, meaning that players can select Niko so that their character has a level of resemblance to him.

Reception 
Niko's character has been well received by both critics and fans. He was voted as the 14th top character of the 2000s decade by readers of Game Informer. In 2008, The Age ranked Niko as the second greatest Xbox character of all time, as "few characters in video game history have provided us with such a spectrum of emotions. Niko's tale is such a roller coaster ride that by the climax you'd be forgiven for feeling exhausted and perhaps even a little numb." IGN's Hilary Goldstein commented "Niko's struggles with his ruthless nature never inhibit the gameplay, but instead enhance the emotional gravity of a brilliant storyline. The more absurd the action becomes, the greater we feel the very real pathos of Niko Bellic." Tom Bramwell of Eurogamer opined Niko "himself is quickly sympathetic - his moral latitude is rooted in horrible war stories, but he's warm-hearted - and imposing." GameDaily included him in a top 25 list of video game anti-heroes, stating that he has a heart-of-gold beneath his rough exterior. In another article, GameDaily listed the "scary foreigner" as one of their top 25 video game archetypes, using Niko as an example of this due to his "European thug" appearance. They also used him as an example for the "walking stereotype" archetype. In 2011, readers of Guinness World Records Gamer's Edition voted Niko as the 13th-top video game character of all time. GamesRadar staff ranked Niko Bellic 97th place in a list of the 100 best heroes in video games, published in 2013. Yahtzee Croshaw of Zero Punctuation found Niko to be an improvement over previous GTA protagonists, regarding him as "a very human, very relatable character who could still believably lose his mind."

References 

Fictional assassins in video games
Fictional alcohol abusers
Fictional characters with post-traumatic stress disorder
Fictional career criminals
Fictional contract killers
Fictional criminals in video games
Fictional Eastern European people
Fictional immigrants to the United States
Fictional martial artists in video games
Fictional mass murderers
Fictional mercenaries in video games
Fictional military personnel in video games
Fictional gangsters
Fictional outlaws
Fictional soldiers in video games
Fictional taxi drivers
Grand Theft Auto IV
Grand Theft Auto characters
Male characters in video games
Fictional war veterans
Video game characters introduced in 2008
Video game mascots
Video game protagonists
Vigilante characters in video games
Fictional bank robbers